Nebraska Highway 128 (N-128) is a highway in southeastern Nebraska.  It has a western terminus at Nebraska Highway 50 south of Syracuse and an eastern terminus at U.S. Highway 75 south of Nebraska City.

Route description
N-128 begins at an intersection with N-50 south of Syracuse and heads east through farmland.  Just west of Lorton, it meets Nebraska Highway 67.  They run concurrent through Lorton, and separate east of there.  N-128 continues east through the unincorporated community of Paul and ends shortly afterward at US 75.

Major intersections

References

External links

The Nebraska Highways Page: Highways 101 to 300
Nebraska Roads: NE 121-192

128
Transportation in Otoe County, Nebraska